The Astronaut Wives Club is a 2015 American period drama television series developed by Stephanie Savage for ABC. It is based on Lily Koppel's 2013 book of the same name. The series tells the story of the wives of the Mercury Seven—America's first group of astronauts—who together formed the Astronaut Wives Club. Actresses Dominique McElligott, Yvonne Strahovski, JoAnna Garcia, Erin Cummings, Azure Parsons, Zoe Boyle, and Odette Annable play the roles of the astronauts' wives.

The Astronaut Wives Club premiered on June 18, 2015.  Following the completion of its run, the series' developer noted the series had been planned as a miniseries, telling a complete story.
However, co-creator Stephanie Savage revealed in an interview with Variety that the producers were interested in making the series an anthology in case it gained a renewal for a second season. Possible seasons would have featured wives of men in the 1920s, wives of World War II soldiers, wives of men who work on Wall Street, and wives of men in the 1980s, among other possible scenarios.

Cast and characters

Main
JoAnna Garcia as Betty Grissom
Yvonne Strahovski as Rene Carpenter
Dominique McElligott as Louise Shepard
Odette Annable as Trudy Cooper
Erin Cummings as Marge Slayton
Azure Parsons as Annie Glenn
Zoe Boyle as Jo Schirra
Desmond Harrington as Alan Shepard
Bret Harrison as Gordon Cooper
Wilson Bethel as Scott Carpenter
Aaron McCusker as Wally Schirra
Kenneth Mitchell as Deke Slayton
Sam Reid as John Glenn
Joel Johnstone as Gus Grissom
Luke Kirby as Max Kaplan

Recurring
 Evan Handler as Duncan "Dunk" Pringle
 Matt Lanter as Ed White
 Antonia Bernath as Susan Borman
 Stella Allen as Alice Shepard
 Madison Wolfe as Julie Shepard
 Lorelei Gilbert as Candy Carpenter
 Dana Gourrier as Antoinette Gibbs
 Haley Strode as Jane Conrad
 Holley Fain as Marilyn Lovell
 Nora Zehetner as Marilyn See
 Alexa Havins as Pat White
 Ryan Doom as Donn F. Eisele

Production
The Astronaut Wives Club was originally scheduled to be broadcast during the 2013–14 American television season. On February 5, 2014, ABC officially ordered a limited series of ten episodes. It was expected to premiere on July 24, 2014, but was pushed to spring 2015 to undergo changes. It premiered on June 18, 2015.

Episodes

Reception
The Astronaut Wives Club has received mixed reviews. Review aggregator site, Metacritic, has given the series a "mixed or average" score of 60 out of 100, based on 23 critics. On another review aggregator site, Rotten Tomatoes, it holds a 50% rating, based on 28 reviews. The critical consensus there reads: "The Astronaut Wives relies on poorly paced storylines and clichéd characters, both used in service of a fact-based narrative that would have been better served in a more serious context."

See also
 Apollo 11 in popular culture
 Men into Space
 The Cape (1996 TV series)
 The Right Stuff (TV series)

References

External links
 
 

2010s American drama television series
2015 American television series debuts
2015 American television series endings
American Broadcasting Company original programming
English-language television shows
Project Mercury
Television shows based on books
Television series about NASA
Television series based on actual events
Television series by ABC Studios
Television series set in the 1960s
Television shows set in Mississippi
Scott Carpenter
Gordon Cooper
John Glenn
Gus Grissom
Wally Schirra
Alan Shepard
Deke Slayton